Dr. Marián Hronský, DrSc. (4 August 1940 in Nová Baňa,  Žarnovica District – 3 June 2012) was a Slovak historian. After graduating from Charles University in Prague, he worked at the Military History Institute in Bratislava and in the Institute of Political Science of SAS. In 2012, he received (in memoriam) the Milan Hodža Award for his scientific activities in the research of the personalities of Slovak politics.

Books 
Slovensko na rázcestí: Slovenské národné rady a gardy v roku 1918 (Východoslovenské vydavateľstvo Košice 1976) 
Vzbura slovenských vojakov v Kragujevci (Osveta Martin 1982) 
Slovensko pri zrode Československa (Pravda Brat. 1987) 
Boj o Slovensko a Trianon 1918-1920 (Národné literárne centrum Brat. 1998) 
TRIANON - Vznik hraníc Slovenska a problémy jeho bezpečnosti 1918-1920 (2011)

References

Further reading

External links 
Books of M.Hronský

Slovak non-fiction writers
20th-century Slovak historians
Slovak political scientists
1940 births
2012 deaths
21st-century Slovak historians
Charles University alumni